The Hance Formation is a geologic formation in Kentucky. It preserves fossils dating back to the Carboniferous period.

See also

 List of fossiliferous stratigraphic units in Kentucky

References
 

Carboniferous Kentucky
Carboniferous southern paleotropical deposits